Michael Madsen (born 20 November 1980) is a Danish former professional ice hockey goaltender.

Career 
Madsen has served as backup goaltender to Peter Hirsch on the Danish national team in several World Championships, as well as several Danish teams in regular season play. On 31 January 2007, he signed with Vaasan Sport in the Finnish Mestis. For the 2007–08 season, Madsen played for the Rødovre Mighty Bulls.

References

External links
 

1980 births
Danish ice hockey goaltenders
Heilbronner EC players
Herlev Hornets players
Hvidovre Ligahockey players
Living people
Nordsjælland Cobras players
Rødovre Mighty Bulls players
Rungsted Seier Capital players
SønderjyskE Ishockey players
Vaasan Sport players
Vojens IK players